Holy Roman Emperor is a retired Thoroughbred racehorse and active sire. He was a leading two-year-old racehorse, winning four races from seven runs in Europe in 2006.

Background
Holy Roman Emperor was sired by Danehill out of a Secretariat mare. Holy Roman Emperor was trained by Aidan O'Brien at Ballydoyle.

Racing career
In 2006 Holy Roman Emperor won two Group One races, the Phoenix Stakes where he defeated the Coventry Stakes winner Hellvelyn and subsequent Group One winning filly Miss Beatrix and the Prix Jean-Luc Lagardère where he defeated the useful French colt Battle Paint. He also defeated subsequent three-year-old mile champion Excellent Art producing a blistering turn of foot to win the Group Two Railway Stakes at the Curragh.

His greatest rival was Teofilo, to whom he finished runner-up twice, firstly in the National Stakes, and later in the Dewhurst Stakes. There was great anticipation of another year of races between the pair, but it was decided in March 2007 to retire Holy Roman Emperor to stud as a replacement for George Washington, who was suffering fertility problems (and was also a son of Danehill).

Stud career
Holy Roman Emperor has been a "shuttle stallion" for Coolmore Stud, standing at Coolmore's main farm in Ireland during the Northern Hemisphere breeding season and travelling to Coolmore's Australia farm to cover mares during the Southern Hemisphere breeding season, but for the 2013 breeding season stands only in Ireland.

Holy Roman Emperor's first runner in the UK or Ireland, High Award trained by Tommy Stack won at the Curragh on March 21, 2010. On 6 May 2012, Holy Roman Emperor's daughter Homecoming Queen won the 1000 Guineas.

In the Year 2014, Designs On Rome, who was later voted as the Hong Kong Horse of the Year, won the Hong Kong Classic Cup, Hong Kong Derby and Queen Elizabeth II Cup.

Notable stock
Holy Roman Emperor is the sire of 14 individual Group 1 winners:

c = colt, f = filly, g = gelding

References

2004 racehorse births
Racehorses bred in Ireland
Racehorses trained in Ireland
Thoroughbred family 4-g